Paula Ramos Esporte Clube, is a sports club based in Florianópolis, the capital of the south Brazilian state of Santa Catarina, founded on 15 December 1937. The football team of the club played its home matches at the Estádio Trindade which had a maximum capacity of 5,000 people.

The football team of Paula Ramos won between 1947 and 1964 six times the city championship of Florianópolis. Highlight was the victory in the State Championship of Santa Catarina, the Campeonato Catarinense, in 1959. In later years the club abandoned professional sports.

Honours 
 Campeonato Catarinense: 1959.
 Campeonato Citadino de Florianópolis: 1947, 1948, 1956, 1961, 1962, 1964.

References 
 Official Website
 Paula Ramos/SC, Futebol Nacional, 2008-01-14.

Association football clubs established in 1937
Defunct football clubs in Santa Catarina (state)
1937 establishments in Brazil